The 1985 European Wrestling Championships  was held from 23 to 28 April 1985 in Leipzig, East Germany.

Medal table

Medal summary

Men's freestyle

Men's Greco-Roman

References

External links
Fila's official championship website

Europe
W
European Wrestling Championships
Euro
Sports competitions in Leipzig
1985 in European sport